The 1998 Hungarian Grand Prix (formally the XIV Marlboro Magyar Nagydíj) was a Formula One motor race held at the Hungaroring, Mogyoród, Pest, Hungary on 16 August 1998. It was the twelfth race of the 1998 Formula One World Championship.

The 77-lap race was won by German driver Michael Schumacher, driving a Ferrari, after he started from third position. Drivers' Championship leader, Finn Mika Häkkinen, took pole position in his McLaren-Mercedes and led the first 46 laps. Under guidance from Ferrari technical director Ross Brawn, Schumacher opted to take three pit stops rather than the two favoured by the McLarens, and took the lead after his second stop, before extending his advantage such that he could retain it after his third stop. Schumacher went on to win by 9.4 seconds from Briton David Coulthard in the other McLaren-Mercedes, with Canadian Jacques Villeneuve third in a Williams-Mecachrome.

With Häkkinen dropping to sixth after shock absorber problems in the closing stages of the race, Schumacher cut the Finn's championship lead to seven points with four races remaining.

In October 1998, the organisers of the race were fined US$1 million, with US$750,000 of it suspended, due to a track invasion. As there was no repeat of this invasion in the following two years, the fine was US$250,000.

Classification

Qualifying

Race

Championship standings after the race

Drivers' Championship standings

Constructors' Championship standings

References

Hungarian Grand Prix
Hungarian Grand Prix
Grand Prix
August 1998 sports events in Europe